Saoli is a town and a tehsil in Chandrapur subdivision of Chandrapur district in Nagpur revenue Division in the Berar region in the state of Maharashtra, India.

History

Geography

References

Cities and towns in Chandrapur district
Talukas in Maharashtra